Bob Bryan and Mike Bryan successfully defended the title by beating Max Mirnyi and Horia Tecău 6–4, 6–4 in the final.

Seeds

Draw

Draw

References
 Main Draw

M